Marian Popescu (14 August 1947 - 19 November 2016) was a Romanian football midfielder.

Honours
CFR Cluj
Divizia B: 1968–69
Argeș Pitești
Divizia A: 1971–72

References

External links
Marian Popescu at Labtof.ro

1947 births
2016 deaths
Romanian footballers
Association football midfielders
Liga I players
Liga II players
FC Argeș Pitești players
CFR Cluj players
FC Rapid București players
FCV Farul Constanța players
CS Universitatea Craiova players